Conservation finance is the practice of raising and managing capital to support land, water, and resource conservation. Conservation financing options vary by source from public, private, and nonprofit funders; by type from loans, to grants, to tax incentives, to market mechanisms; and by scale ranging from federal to state, national to local.  

Conservationists have traditionally relied upon private, philanthropic capital in the form of solicited donations, foundation grants, etc., and public, governmental funds in the form of tax incentives, ballot measures, bonding, agency appropriations, etc., to fund conservation projects and initiatives.  

Although governments and philanthropists provide a moderate amount of funds, conservationist believe there is a shortage in the capital required to preserve global ecosystems.  On an annual basis, they estimate in 2018 that investors must allocate $300 to $400 billion to meet worldwide conservation needs.  From this amount, funders only provide approximately $52 billion per year to conservation finance. Increasingly, conservationists are embracing a broader range of funding and financing options, leveraging traditional “philanthropic and government resources with other sources of capital, including that from the capital markets."  These non-traditional sources of conservation capital include debt-financing, emerging tax benefits, private equity investments, and project financing. These additional sources of leverage serve to enlarge the pool of financial capital available to fund conservation work worldwide and, as this financial capital is invested, the asset portfolio of conserved land, water and natural resources is grown.

Government Sources

Debt-for-Nature Swaps

Governments finance various forms of conservation finance.  One such method involves establishing debt-for-nature swaps that aid environmental sustainability efforts in developing nations.  Originated in the 1980s, this concept allows for public and private interests to purchase debt from a developing country.  Consequently, that nation's purchased debt is discharged in part or in full.  The government then spends the money on domestic conservation projects.  While developed nations participate in these transactions, private institutions purchase this debt as well.  For example, commercial banks buy this debt and sell the portfolio at discounted prices to other investors or financial firms.  Third-party organizations, particularly NGOs, participate in these swaps to secure currency or help develop governmental programs using the newly acquired funds.  In 1987, Bolivia successfully implemented the first debt-for-nature swap.  The Bolivian government sold $650,000 of its debt for $100,000.  In exchange, Bolivia agreed to provide funding for sustainability efforts in Beni's wildlife reserve.  Since the world's most indebted nations also contain diverse ecosystems, debt-for-nature swaps draw significant attention towards conservation efforts in the most fragile parts of the biosphere.

Foreign Aid

Foreign aid is instrumental in implementing global conservation finance efforts.  The USAID is a federal agency within the United States committed to foreign aid and emphasizes conservation for developmental purposes.  The agency allocates $200 million per year towards worldwide efforts to conserve species.  One focus is developing conservation zones, particularly in coastal wetlands. These zones preserve fish species, thus strengthening both the local ecosystem and the fishing industry's profitability.  Foreign aid directly provides resources to countries helps to facilitate conservation finance projects.

Private sector sources

Climate business

Climate business is a private-sector strategy for conservation finance that some organizations advocate for.  This would allow businesses to adopt clean technologies and services that promote efficiency standards.  These standards consist of managing capital and using those funds to implement multiple business practices.  Examples include investing in low carbon energy generation for office buildings.  Such infrastructure would drastically reduce greenhouse gas emissions, let alone carbon.  According to the World Bank Group, climate business would require accurate and scalable models to address a firm's environmental impact.  In order for such models to remain relevant to firms, it is suggested that businesses remain cognizant of solutions throughout the global markets.  One group that advocates this private-sector strategy is the International Finance Corporation (IFC), a member of the World Bank Group that facilitates private-sector investment in developing nations.  The institution argues that such an approach should function on a global scale.  According to the IFC, widespread adoption of climate business would lead to decreasing technological costs and favorable financial incentives for both the developing and developed world.

Payment for ecosystem services (PES)

A payment for ecosystem services (PES) broadly refers to any payment that is aimed to incentivize conserving and restoring ecological systems.  These systems could include any ecosystem, such as a river or forest, that facilitates vital environmental processes.  For instance, forests serve multiple functions in this regard.  They provide environmental goods, such as food, facilitate nutrient cycling and other biological processes.  Due to environmental degradation, these ecological systems are threatened.  PES is a form of conservation finance that rewards people for maintaining these ecosystem services, often using financial incentives.  In order to facilitate these transactions, the service provider must clearly define the service and secure an ecosystem which needs those particular resources.  In addition, service purchasers carefully monitor the providers to ensure that conversation is efficiently carried out.

Many developing countries implement this market-based mechanism to address conservation needs in different ways.  Nations that rely heavily on PES to improve conservation efforts include Vietnam, Brazil and Costa Rica.  Parties in developing countries can facilitate PES in a variety of market types.  Some PES markets exist with little to no regulations in place.  Without a formal regulatory system, buyers must negotiate directly with sellers to obtain reasonable terms.  Consequently, all PES transactions in these voluntary markets are priced and paid for privately.  Formal regulatory markets require that legislators in respective countries determine how PES transactions are implemented.  For instance, regulatory caps are placed on investments in specific forms of conservation.  Buyers and sellers in the PES market are also strictly defined in legislation.  While private parties are still encouraged to negotiate with each other, this formal system mandates legal boundaries intended to protect both buyers and sellers.  Since the 1990s, Costa Rica has experimented with using PES to preserve the nation's ecosystems.  Costa Rica uses a unique system in which the government pays service providers directly.  Service providers are often farmers who own substantial properties containing forests and other sites that require conservation.  However, many believe that these public funds should not disproportionately go to wealthy farmers and private companies.  Instead, they conclude that the Costa Rican government should enable more service providers who live in poverty to compete and receive compensation.

Green bonds
Green bonds are liquid investment vehicles that raise capital for conservation efforts and environmentally stable practices in general.  Investors commit their capital to these bonds and the money is then allocated towards green initiatives.  Investors range from private corporations and firms to municipalities and even state governments.  Conservation efforts include preserving endangered watersheds and rainforests.  Over time, the investors would hypothetically receive a profitable return from these initial investments.  Many financial professional argue that these green bonds symbolize a historic shift from investing in fossil fuel-based industry to climate change mitigation.  They speculate that this would attract more investors and create more diversified portfolios among this base.  The first Green Bond initiative was San Francisco's solar bonds authority to finance both conservation and local renewables, placed on the ballot and approved by voters in 2001 and incorporated into its Community Choice Aggregation program.  In the late-2000s, the World Bank Treasury and the IFC pioneered these investments.  In 2013, the IFC issued about $3.7 billion worth of green bonds to the private sector.  Green bonds also consistently achieve high security ratings from bond rating agencies.  For instance, the bonds issued from the IFC and the World Bank generally receive AAA/Aaa.  This indicates a high level of quality and security for investors who seek to enter this market.

See also
Conservation movement
Payment for ecosystem services
Public bonds
Debt-for-Nature Swap
Conservation easement
Ballot initiative

References

Bibliography

External links
 The Conservation Finance Network

Environmental economics
Environmentalism
·